Associated Credit Union is a credit union based in Norcross, Georgia.

Associated Credit Union is the fifth largest credit union in Georgia with over 162,000 members and assets of $1.58 billion as of March 2018. They operate 26 branch locations in Georgia. In addition, Associated Credit Union belongs to the CO-OP Network which provides its members access to over 30,000 surcharge-free ATMs and 5,000 Shared Branch locations.

References

Companies based in Atlanta
Credit unions based in Georgia (U.S. state)
1930 establishments in Georgia (U.S. state)